The Onega Tractor Plant or Onezhskiy Tractor Plant is a major Russian machine-building manufacturing plant in Petrozavodsk, Karelia, Russia.

History
The plant was established on August 29, 1703. The first  tractor,  tracked skidder the TDT-40 model, was manufactured on 1956. The Onega Tractor Plant (OTZ) is a company in Russia that manufactures and markets a range of forestry vehicles and machinery such as forwarders and harvesters.

Historical products

Products

The company produces tracked all-terrain vehicles with amphibious, tractors tracked and skidders, forwarders, harvesters.

Tractors
Onezhets-310
Onezhets-380
Onezhets-390
Onezhets-392
Onezhets-395
Onezhets-400
Onezhets-500 Amphibian

Skidders
Onezhets-320
Onezhets-330
Onezhets-335
Onezhets-420
Onezhets-460

Forwarders
Onezhets-350
Onezhets-KH-7

Harvesters
Onezhets-KH-451 
Onezhets-KH-8

References

External links

 History Museum OTZ 
 Онежский Трактор официальный сайт 

Russian brands
Log transport
Concern Tractor Plants
Manufacturing companies of the Soviet Union
Companies based in the Republic of Karelia